Acilacris is a genus of "false shieldback"  bush crickets or katydids in the subfamily Meconematinae, found in southern Africa.

Subgenera and species
Acilacris contains two subgenera, Acilacris and Aroegas:

Acilacris (Acilacris) Bolívar, 1890
 Acilacris furcatus Naskrecki, 1996 — Mt. Coke false shieldback
 Acilacris kristinae Naskrecki, 1996 — Kristin's false shieldback
 Acilacris obovatus Naskrecki, 1996 — Limpopo false shieldback
 Acilacris tridens Bolívar, 1890 - type species

Acilacris (Aroegas) Péringuey, 1916
 Acilacris dilatatus (Naskrecki, 1996) – dilated false shieldback
 Acilacris fuscus (Naskrecki, 1996) – brown false shieldback
 Acilacris nigroornatus (Péringuey, 1916) – black-spotted false shieldback
 Acilacris rentzi (Naskrecki, 1996) – Rentz's false shieldback

Note: A. incisus is now Ovonotus incisus (Naskrecki, 1996)

References

Meconematinae
Orthoptera of Africa
Tettigoniidae genera